Jonathan H. Earle is an author, historian, professor, and dean. He is an historian of American politics and culture who focuses on the early republic and antebellum periods, especially the antislavery movement and the sectional crisis leading up to the Civil War. Currently Earle serves as Dean of the Roger Hadfield Ogden Honors College at Louisiana State University, a post he has held since 2014.

Early life and education 
A native of suburban Washington, D.C., Earle is a specialist in the history of the antebellum United States.  Earle was educated at Columbia (BA History) and Princeton (MA, Ph.D U.S. History) Universities.

Career 
Earle entered the University of Kansas in 1997, where he taught as a longtime faculty member in the Department of History. During his time at Kansas he served as the Associate Director of the Robert J. Dole Institute of Politics between 2003–2010. In 2013, Earle was named director of the University Honors Program at Kansas, where he served until 2014. Since 2014 Earle has been Dean of the LSU Roger Hadfield Ogden Honors College. Under his leadership, the Ogden Honors College received a $12 million naming gift from New Orleans philanthropist Roger Ogden, fully renovated the French House — the historic building at the center of LSU's campus which houses the College's classroom, advising, staff, and co-curricular spaces — and, in partnership with LSU's provost and president, greatly increased the university's financial and academic commitment to honors education.

He is the author of numerous books and articles including Jacksonian Antislavery and the Politics of Free Soil (UNC Press, 2004), John Brown's Raid: A Brief History With Documents (Bedford/St. Martin's Press, 2008), The Routledge Atlas of African American History (Routledge, 2000), and co-author of Major Problems in the Early American Republic (Cengage, 2007).  Earle is the recipient of the Society of Historians of the Early American Republic's 2005 Broussard prize and co-winner of the Byron Caldwell Smith Book Prize. In 2013, the University Press of Kansas published his edited collection Bleeding Kansas, Bleeding Missouri: The Long Civil War on the Border, which was named a Notable Book by the Kansas State Library.

In the Spring semester of 2017 Earle co-taught an Honors seminar course at LSU titled "272 Slaves: Discovering Louisiana's (And Georgetown's) Past" with Jennifer Cramer, director of the T. Harry Williams Center for Oral History with the LSU library. The course covered the complex history of slavery in the United States, with a special focus on the Louisiana descendants of a group of 272 slaves sold in 1838 by the Jesuit Maryland Province. A parallel course was taught at Georgetown University, granting students from both universities the opportunity to discuss shared readings over Skype. The course gained prominent local and national coverage.

Earle is currently working on a book on the election of 1860 for the Pivotal Moments in U.S. History Series published by Oxford University Press.

Honors, awards, and recognitions 
In support of his research, Earle has received major fellowships from the NEH and the American Council of Learned Societies. He spent the 2006–2007 academic year as the Ray Allen Billington Chair in U.S. History at Occidental College and the Huntington Library and the 1999–2000 academic year as an NEH Fellow at the Huntington.  Earle has appeared on numerous programs and documentaries on the History Channel, C-SPAN, and PBS. The History News Network named him a Top Young Historian in 2007.

Publications

Books, edited volumes 
 (2013). Jonathan Earle and Diane Mutti Burke, eds. Bleeding Kansas, Bleeding Missouri: The Long Civil War on the Border. University Press of Kansas. 
 (2008). Jonathan Earle. John Brown’s Raid on Harpers Ferry: A Brief History with Documents. Boston, MA: Bedford/St. Martin's Press. 
 (2007). Jonathan Earle and Sean Wilentz. Major Problems in the Early Republic. Boston, MA: Houghton Mifflin. 
 (2004). Jonathan Earle. Jacksonian Antislavery and the Politics of Free Soil, 1824–1854. Chapel Hill, NC: The University of North Carolina Press. 
 (2000). Jonathan Earle. The Routledge Atlas of African American History. Routledge Atlases of American History. New York: Routledge.

Books, chapters 
 (2015). Earle, Jonathan H. "Beecher's Bibles and Broadswords: Paving the Way for the Civil War in the West, 1854-1859."  In Virginia Scharff, ed., Empire and Liberty: The Civil War in the West. University of California Press. 
 (2013). Earle, Jonathan H. "'If I Went West, I Think I Would Go to Kansas': Abraham Lincoln, the Sunflower State, and the Election of 1860." In Bleeding Kansas, Bleeding Missouri: The Long Civil War on the Border. University Press of Kansas. 
 (2011). Earle, Jonathan. "Saturday Evenings at the Baileys': Building an Antislavery Movement in Congress, 1833-1854." In In the Shadow of Freedom: The Politics of Slavery in the National Capital, edited by Paul Finkelman and Donald R. Kennon. Athens, OH: Ohio University Press. 
 (2006). Earle, Jonathan. ""John Brown of Osawatomie: The Making of an Anti-Slavery Warrior"." In John Brown to Bob Dole: Movers and Shakers in Kansas History, edited by Virgil Dean, 3-34. University Press of Kansas.

Books, chapters in textbooks 
 (2003). Earle, Jonathan. "Building an American Republic: From the First Imperial Crisis to The Federalist." In Patterns in Western Civilization, edited by James Woelfel and Sarah Trulove, 52–95. 3rd ed. Houghton Mifflin.

Encyclopedia entries 
 (2000). Earle, Jonathan. "Abolitionism and Violence, 1831-1865." In Vol. 1, Violence in America: An Encyclopedia, 67–75. Charles Scribner's Sons.

Journal articles 
 Earle, Jonathan. "The Political Origins of the Civil War." OAH Magazine of History 25 (2011): 8-23.
 Earle, Jonathan. "Civil War at 150: The Political Origins of the Civil War." Organization of American Historians Magazine of History 25, no. 2 (April 2011).
 Earle, Jonathan. "The Making of the North's 'Stark Mad Abolitionists': Antislavery Conversion in the United States, 1824-1854." Slavery and Abolition 25, no. 3 (December 2004): 54–72.
 Earle, Jonathan. "Marcus Morton and the Dilemma of Jacksonian Antislavery in Massachusetts, 1817-1849." Massachusetts Historical Review 4 (2002): 61–87.
 Earle, Jonathan. "'Peculiarly Woman's Cause': Feminism, Race and the Struggle for Equality." Reviews in American History 28 (June 2000): 223–229.

References 

American male writers
Living people
Year of birth missing (living people)
Columbia College (New York) alumni
Princeton University alumni
Louisiana State University faculty
University of Kansas faculty